Macratria is a genus of antlike flower beetles in the family Anthicidae. There are more than 30 described species in Macratria.

Species
These 37 species belong to the genus Macratria:

 Macrarthrius pallipes Motschulsky, 1863
 Macratria abun Telnov, 2012
 Macratria alleni Telnov, 2012
 Macratria aotearoa Werner & Chandler, 1995
 Macratria appendiculata (Abdullah, 1964)
 Macratria asmat Telnov, 2012
 Macratria ayamaru Telnov, 2017
 Macratria berdnikovi Telnov, 2017
 Macratria brazzaensis Telnov, 2012
 Macratria brunnea Casey, 1895
 Macratria citak Telnov, 2017
 Macratria confusa LeConte, 1855
 Macratria cryptica Telnov, 2012
 Macratria dani Telnov, 2011
 Macratria eparaksts Telnov, 2017
 Macratria femoralis Champion, 1896
 Macratria forficula Telnov, 2012
 Macratria gigantea Wickham, 1910
 Macratria griseosellata
 Macratria hungarica (Hampe, 1873)
 Macratria marind Telnov, 2017
 Macratria murina (Fabricius, 1801)
 Macratria obiensis Telnov, 2017
 Macratria opaca Telnov, 2012
 Macratria patani Telnov, 2017
 Macratria pluvialis Telnov, 2012
 Macratria pseudodensata Telnov, 2012
 Macratria rectipilis Telnov, 2012
 Macratria riparia Telnov, 2012
 Macratria sahu Telnov, 2017
 Macratria serialis Marseul, 1876
 Macratria spathulata Telnov, 2012
 Macratria succinia Abdullah, 1965
 Macratria tamarau Telnov, 2012
 Macratria testaceilabris Pic, 1940
 Macratria trimembris Telnov, 2012
 Macratria tripunctata (Abdullah, 1964)

References

Further reading

External links

 

Anthicidae
Articles created by Qbugbot